Troy, also known as Troy Hill Farm, is a historic slave plantation home located at Elkridge, Howard County, Maryland, United States. It is associated with the prominent Dorsey family of Howard County, who also built Dorsey Hall.

History
The lands of "Troy" were surveyed by Hon. John Dorsey in 1694, where he moved in 1696 with 2 slaves. The property stayed in the family though his great-grandson Col. Thomas Dorsey (-1790) of the American Revolution whose estate sold it in 1808. Thomas Dorsey would use the root cellar as a meeting place with Benjamin Warfield of Cherry Grove during the revolutionary war. Thomas's widow Elizabeth split Troy several times to pay debts. Vincent Bailey acquired  including Troy for $6,520. A stone house named "Troy Hill" was built about 1808 on the foundation of an much earlier one story Dorsey house by Vincent Baily and is representative of the late Georgian style in Maryland architecture. The -story fieldstone house is three bays wide and two deep. Outbuildings included a stone barn, smokehouse and dairy. Situated on a hill, the fieldstone basement is unusually large with four rooms.

An 1830 fire destroyed the original wood paneling. In 1880, the house was modified with cottage styling. In 1942, the house was modified again into a "Colonial Revival" style. Further modification occurred by owner Pedro De Valle. Donald Doll was the last resident before the state purchased the property on 16 December 1958 to destroy it to make way for the I-95 project. The house was left in a state of purposeful neglect until Howard County purchased the stripped house and 52 surrounding acres in September 1971 for $67,500. In 1978, Howard County proposed to build an interpretative gardening center at the house. In 1989, the state offered a $350,000 matching grant for renovation, but a spring 1991 fire gutted the building before it was spent.

Current status
Most of the surrounding Troy Hill farm has been converted into office parks or highway with the exception of one large area of wooded parkland surrounding the unrestored Troy House. In 2012, County Executive Ken Ulman proposed converting the remainder of the Troy Hill estate and wooded parkland into a Tennis Center. After costs escalated, the plans were changed to clear-cut most of the wooded parkland around the historic structure to implement revenue-generating ball fields and soccer fields for the parks system, allowing the Troy house to stand in the parking lot as a possible meeting house or restaurant.

Troy was listed on the National Register of Historic Places in 1979. In 2015, the group Preservation Howard County placed the house on its top 10 most endangered list.

See also
Troy Park
List of Howard County properties in the Maryland Historical Trust
Marshalee (Elkridge, Maryland)
Spurrier's Tavern

References

External links
, including undated photo, at Maryland Historical Trust

Houses completed in 1808
Houses on the National Register of Historic Places in Maryland
Georgian architecture in Maryland
Howard County, Maryland landmarks
Houses in Howard County, Maryland
Historic American Buildings Survey in Maryland
National Register of Historic Places in Howard County, Maryland
Dorsey family of Maryland